The black-headed berryeater (Carpornis melanocephala) is a species of bird in the family Cotingidae. It is endemic to Brazil.

Its natural habitat is subtropical or tropical moist lowland forests. It is threatened by habitat loss.

Identification
Green and yellow with red iris, bodies are mostly black and olive. They have short dark bills.

References

External links
BirdLife Species Factsheet.

black-headed berryeater
black-headed berryeater
Taxonomy articles created by Polbot